The Man Without a Past is a 2002 Finnish comedy-drama film produced, written, and directed by Aki Kaurismäki. Starring Markku Peltola, Kati Outinen and Juhani Niemelä, it is the second installment in Kaurismäki's Finland trilogy, the other two films being Drifting Clouds (1996) and Lights in the Dusk (2006). The film was nominated for the Academy Award for Best Foreign Language Film in 2002 (the only Finnish film so far) and won the Grand Prix at the 2002 Cannes Film Festival.

Plot 
The film begins with an unnamed man arriving by train to Helsinki. After falling asleep in Kaisaniemi Park, he is mugged and beaten by hoodlums and is left with severe head injuries, losing consciousness. He awakes and wanders back to the train station and collapses in its toilet. He awakes the second time in a hospital and finds that he has lost his memory. He starts his life from scratch, living in a shipping container, finding clothes with help from the Salvation Army and making friends with his poor neighbours.

Cast 
Markku Peltola as M
Kati Outinen as Irma
Juhani Niemelä as Nieminen
Kaija Pakarinen as Kaisa Nieminen
Sakari Kuosmanen as Anttila
Annikki Tähti as Manager of Flea Market
Anneli Sauli as Bar Owner
Elina Salo as Dock Clerk
Outi Mäenpää as Bank Clerk
Esko Nikkari as Bank Robber
Pertti Sveholm as Police Detective
Matti Wuori as himself (lawyer)
Aino Seppo as Ex-wife
Janne Hyytiäinen as Ovaskainen
Antti Reini as Electrician

Production
The Man Without a Past was co-produced by the Finnish companies Sputnik and YLE, the German companies Bavaria Film Studios and Pandora Filmproduktion and the French company Pyramide Productions.

Critical reception 
The film received overwhelmingly positive reviews from critics. On Rotten Tomatoes, the film has a rating of 98%, based on 99 critics, with an average rating of 7.98/10. The site's critical consensus reads, "Kaurismäki delivers another droll comedy full of his trademark humor." On Metacritic, the film has a score of 84 out of 100, based on 29 critics, indicating "universal acclaim". Roger Ebert awarded the film three-and-a-half stars out of 4, saying he "felt a deep but indefinable contentment". Kirk Honeycutt of The Hollywood Reporter said the film "contains not one false note. It is the work of an artist fully in control of his art."<ref>Honeycutt, Kirk. The Man Without A Past (Finland), The Hollywood Reporter, January 1, 2005. Accessed February 5, 2008. Archived from the original on December 12, 2006.</ref> Barbara Scharres of the Chicago Reader'' said that Kaurismäki "perfects his trademark formula of deadpan humor and arctic circle pathos in this brilliantly ironic 2002 comedy."

Awards and nominations

References

External links 
 
 
 
 
 
 
 
 
 

2002 films
2002 comedy-drama films
Films directed by Aki Kaurismäki
2000s Finnish-language films
The Salvation Army
Films about amnesia
Films set in Helsinki
Best Foreign Film Guldbagge Award winners
Finnish comedy-drama films
Cannes Grand Prix winners